Rugby sevens  at the 2015 Pan American Games was held in Toronto, Ontario, Canada from July 11 to 12. The rugby sevens competition was held at BMO Field, although due to naming rights, the venue was known as Exhibition Stadium for the duration of the games. This was the second time that the men's competition was held, following rugby sevens's debut at the 2011 Games, with women's rugby sevens  making its debut. A total of eight men's and six women's teams competed in each respective tournament.

Competition schedule

The following is the competition schedule for the rugby sevens competitions:

Medal table

Medalists

Qualification
A total of eight men's teams and six women's team have qualified to compete at the games. Each nation may enter one team in each tournament (12 athletes per team) for a maximum total of 24 athletes.

Men

Women

Participating nations
A total of nine countries have qualified rugby sevens teams. The numbers in parenthesis represents the number of participants qualified.

See also
Rugby sevens at the 2016 Summer Olympics

References

 
2015
Rugby sevens
2015 rugby sevens competitions
International rugby union competitions hosted by Canada
2015 in Canadian rugby union
2015 in North American rugby union
2015 in South American rugby union